Shorea teysmanniana is a timber tree of the family Dipterocarpaceae. It occurs in Sumatra, Peninsular Malaysia and Borneo.

References

teysmanniana
Trees of Sumatra
Trees of Peninsular Malaysia
Trees of Borneo